Blacktail triplefin is a common name for several species of fish in the threefin blenny family (Tripterygiidae) and may refer to:

Enneapterygius bahasa, also known as the blacktail threefin, a species of threefin blenny known from reefs in the western Pacific Ocean
Enneapterygius nigricauda, a species of triplefin blenny
Enneapterygius similis, also known as black and red triplefin or masked threefin
Helcogramma aquila

See also
Japanese blacktail triplefin, Springerichthys bapturus